Jean-Drapeau station is a Montreal Metro station in Montreal, Quebec, Canada. It is operated by the Société de transport de Montréal (STM) and serves the Yellow Line. It is situated on the Saint Helen's Island in the Saint Lawrence River.

Overview  

Build to serve the Expo 67 site, the station opened on 1 April 1967. It was originally named Île Sainte-Hélène, after the island on which it is located. The station was designed to handle large crowds, with a side platform design and large staircases to a ground level concourse. During Expo 67, the station handled over 60,000 passengers an hour. 

The station now serves the various attractions on Saint Helen's Island and Notre Dame Island - including Jean-Drapeau Park, the La Ronde amusement park and the Montreal Casio, as well as events like the Canadian Grand Prix at Circuit Gilles Villeneuve. This station was the least busy in the network in 2020 and 2021, with the COVID-19 pandemic closing and later reducing the capacity of most of these points of interest.

In May 2001, the station was renamed after Jean Drapeau, mayor of Montreal from 1954 to 1957 and 1960 to 1986, who is often given credit for the construction of the Metro, and for securing both Expo 67 and the 1976 Summer Olympics. 

The station was made accessible in November 2019 with the construction of two elevators. Despite being of one the least used stations on the network, elevators were installed due to low technical complexity and low cost of installation. , none of the other stations on the Yellow line are not accessible. Construction work is currently underway at Berri-UQAM to allow accessible access to the Yellow line platforms.

Artwork 
Painted concrete murals by the station architect Jean Dumontier depict the mythological Titan Atlas holding up the roof of the station. Dumontier was the first architect of the metro to create his own artworks for stations of his own design.

Connecting bus routes

Nearby points of interest
 Biosphère
 Casino de Montréal
 Circuit Gilles Villeneuve
 La Ronde
 Parc Jean-Drapeau
 Stewart Museum

References

External links
Montreal by Metro at metrodemontreal.com
 2011 STM System Map
 Metro Map
Metro at Expo 67

1967 establishments in Quebec
Yellow Line (Montreal Metro)
Expo 67
Parc Jean-Drapeau
Railway stations in Canada opened in 1967